The Iemerii (Gaulish: *Iemerioi, 'the twins') were a Celto-Ligurian tribe dwelling in the Val Chisone (Cottian Alps) during the Iron Age.

Name 
They are mentioned as Iemeriorum on an inscription.

The ethnic name Iemerii is a Latinized form of *Iemerioi, which can be compared with the Gaulish noun iemurioi, meaning 'twins'.

Geography 
The Iemerii lived in the Val Chisone, in the Cottian Alps. Their territory was located north of the Maielli, west of the Taurini.

History 
They appear on the Arch of Susa, erected by Cottius in 9–8 BC.

References

Bibliography 

Historical Celtic peoples
Gauls
Tribes of pre-Roman Gaul